Castro is a municipality in the state of Paraná in the Southern Region of Brazil. In 2020 it had a population of 71,809 people. The main road running through the town is the PR-151 road.

Economy
Castrolanda is a colony that was founded by Dutch immigrants between 1951 and 1954. Testament to this there is a windmill in Castro. Its economy is based on agricultural production and dairy farming which is one of the most important in this region that is considered the largest dairy in Brazil due to their genetic quality. It has a considerable production of grain, mostly soy and beans. Also having one of the largest agricultural cooperatives in Brazil, which bears the name of the colony.

Notable people 
 Aimée de Heeren (1903-2006), WW2 secret service agent, girlfriend of Patrick J Kennedy Jr, socialite
 Paulo Miranda (1988-), football player

See also
List of municipalities in Paraná

References